Gökçebağ is a belde in the Siirt District of Siirt Province in Turkey. It had a population of 1,741 in 2021.

References 

Villages in Siirt District
Kurdish settlements in Siirt Province